The following is a list of mounted police units in the world:

Angola
 Mounted Police Unit (Unidade de Polícia Montada)

Argentina
 Mounted Police Corps of the Argentine Federal Police (Cuerpo de Policia Montada de la Policia Federal Argentina)

Australia

New South Wales Police Force Mounted Police Unit
Queensland Police Service Mounted Police Unit
South Australia Mounted Police Cadre
Victoria Police Mounted Branch
Western Australia Police Force Mounted Section
Australian Federal Police Ceremonial Mounted Cadre

Barbados
 Royal Barbados Police Force Mounted Troop

Belgium
 Cavalry department, part of the General Reserve of the Federal Police.
 Royal Mounted Escort (Escorte Royale à Cheval – Koninklijk Escorte te Paard)

Brazil

Military Police of Paraná State Regimento de Polícia Montada Coronel Dulcídio
Polícia Militar do Estado de Goiás Regimento de Cavalaria
Polícia Militar do Estado de São Paulo Regimento de Cavalaria 9 de Julho
Polícia Militar do Estado do Ceará Regimento de Polícia Montada Coronel Moura Brasil
Polícia Militar de Minas Gerais Regimento de Cavalaria Alferes Tiradentes (RCAT) established 1775, originally under the name of Regimento Regular de Cavalaria de Minas
Polícia Militar da Bahia Esquadrão de Polícia Montada

Canada

Royal Canadian Mounted Police, established 1873 as the North-West Mounted Police
Calgary Police Service Mounted Unit, established 1978
Halifax Regional Police Mounted Patrol established 1905; early unit established 1869
 Dartmouth Police mounted unit, established 1925
Service de police de la Ville de Montréal Cavalry, established 1885
Royal Newfoundland Constabulary Mounted Unit, established 2003
 Newfoundland Constabulary Mounted Force 1873–1894
 New Fire Brigade Mounted Force 1895–1922
 Newfoundland Constabulary 1922–1951
Toronto Police Service Mounted Unit, established 1886 by the then Toronto Police Department
Vancouver Police Department Mounted Squad, established 1908
Hamilton Police Service Mounted Patrol Unit, established 2010
York Regional Police Ceremonial Mounted Unit

Chile

 Carabiners of Chile Cavalry Training School "General Óscar Cristi Gallo" (Escuela de Caballería de Carabineros "General Óscar Cristi Gallo")

Colombia
 Colombian Carabineers (Carabineros de Colombia)

Denmark

 Københavns Politi (Copenhagen Police), horses disappeared in the 70's but was reestablished in 1998.

Bulgaria
 Sofia Metropolitan Directorate of Interior Cavalry Squadron, Sofia (since 1956)

France

 Brigade équestre de la Police Nationale (since 1994)
 Garde Républicaine#Regiment of cavalry

Finland
Helsinki Mounted Police Helsingin Ratsupoliisi (since 1882)

Germany
Reiterstaffel Baden-Württemberg
Reiterstaffel Bayern
Reiterstaffel Bundespolizei
Reiterstaffel Hessen
Reiterstaffel Niedersachsen
Reiterstaffel Nordrhein-Westfalen – 32 horses
Reiterstaffel Sachsen

Greece
Hellenic Mounted Police (Ελληνική Έφιππη Αστυνομία)

India

Gujarat Police Mounted Police Unit
Kolkata Police Mounted Police Unit
Kerala Police Mounted Police Unit
Karnataka Police Mounted Police Unit
Mumbai Police Mounted Police unit
Hyderabad Police Mounted Police Unit
 Chennai Police Mounted Police Unit

Iran
ASVARAN, Mounted Police Unit of Law Enforcement Force of Islamic Republic of Iran

Ireland
Garda Mounted Support Unit

Israel
Israeli Police Horses and Dogs Section

Italy
4th Carabinieri Mounted Regiment – Rome
Polizia di Stato Horse Services Coordination Center – Ladispoli
 Mounted  Squad "Lamarmora" – Rome
 Mounted  Squad "Villa Umberto" – Rome
 Mounted  Squad "Tor di Quinto" – Rome
 Mounted  Squad – Milan
 Mounted  Squad – Florence
 Mounted  Squad – Naples
 Mounted  Squad – Palermo
 Mounted  Squad – Catania
 Mounted  Squad – Torino

Jamaica 
Jamaica Constabulary Force Mounted Troop Division

Japan 
 Tokyo Metropolitan Police Department – 15 horses
 National Police Agency (Japan) Imperial Guard (Guard of Honour) – 14 horses
 Kyoto Prefectural Police Heiann-Kibatai – 16 horses

Latvia
 Latvian State police – mounted police patrols in Riga established in 2000.

Lesotho 
Lesotho Mounted Police Service

Lithuania
 Vilnius county police – mounted police patrols in Vilnius – 20 horses.

Malaysia 
 Royal Malaysia Police – mounted police patrols by PGA Briged Kuala Lumpur.

Malta
Malta Police Force

Mexico
Guardia Rural

Montenegro
Tim policije na konjima Mounted Police Team – 10 horses, established 2007

Netherlands

Korps landelijke politiediensten Mounted Police and Police Dog Service (DLHP)

Norway
Oslo Police District, Rytterkorpset (Special Services Section), aka "Det Ridende Politi" / "The Mounted Police" at Oslo Politidistrikt, (Spesialseksjonen), in Oslo that was established in 1893, (Centennial in 1993 celebrated with celebratory ride across the USA) At present 15 horses and around 25 officers.

Poland

Komenda Miejska Policji w Chorzowie Mounted Team of Prevention Section
Komenda Miejska Policji w Częstochowie Mounted Team
Komenda Miejska Policji w Poznaniu Mounted Platoon
Komenda Miejska Policji w Szczecinie Mounted Unit
Komenda Stołeczna Policji w Warszawie Mounted Platoon

Portugal
Guarda Nacional Republicana Regimento de Cavalaria

Puerto Rico
Puerto Rico Police Department Puerto Rico Mounted Police (FURA- Rapid Forces of Fast Action)

Romania
Jandarmeria Română Mounted Detachment, established 1893
Bucharest Local Police – 24 horses mounted patrol unit
Iași Local Police – 6 horses mounted patrol unit

Serbia
Serbian Police, Police Directorate for the City of Belgrade, Special Police Unit – Police Brigade, Mounted Unit

South Africa

 Frontier Armed and Mounted Police (1855–1878)
 Northern Border Police (1868–1873 and 1879–1882)
 Natal Police (originally Natal Mounted Police) (1874–1913)
 Cape Mounted Police (originally Cape Police)(1882–1913)
 Bechuanaland Mounted Police (1884–1885)
 South African Constabulary (1900–1908)
 South African Police Service Pretoria Mounted Unit

Spain
 Civil Guard Cavalry Squad (1844–present)
 National Police Cavalry Units (1825–present). Since 1986 with the current name.
 Other police units of local and regional level also have some cavalry units.

Sri Lanka
Sri Lanka Police Mounted Division

Sweden
The police in the three largest cities (Stockholm, Göteborg and Malmö) have mounted units. These units may be dispatched all over Sweden.

Switzerland
As of 2009, the following Swiss police forces employ mounted units:
 Cantonal Police of Berne (since 1914, eleven officers)
 Police in Martigny
 Police in St. Gallen (since June 2009)

United Arab Emirates
Abu Dhabi Police Cavalry has been established in the middle of the 20th century. It is known as the most effective police in terms of crimes prevention, community policing and social responsibility.

United Kingdom

Active mounted sections
Avon and Somerset Constabulary Mounted Section
City of London Police Mounted unit
Gloucestershire Constabulary Mounted Section (re-established in 2016)
Greater Manchester Police Mounted Unit
Lancashire Constabulary Mounted Branch
Merseyside Police Mounted Section
Metropolitan Police Mounted Branch
Northumbria Police Mounted Unit
Police Service of Scotland Mounted Branch
South Wales Police Mounted Unit
South Yorkshire Police Mounted Section
Thames Valley Police Mounted Section
West Yorkshire Police Mounted Section

Recently disbanded sections
Royal Military Police Mounted Troop (disbanded in 1995)
Essex Police Mounted Unit (disbanded in 2012)
Royal Parks Constabulary Mounted Branch (absorbed into Metropolitan Police in 2004)
West Midlands Police Mounted Unit (disbanded in 1999)
Nottinghamshire Police Mounted Unit (disbanded in 2012)

United States

Alabama
DeKalb County Sheriff's Office  Mounted Unit, Alabama
Etowah County Sheriff's Mounted Unit, Alabama
Florence Police Mounted Patrol, Alabama
Mobile County Sheriffs Office Mounted Unit, Mobile, Alabama
Mobile Police Department Mounted Unit, Alabama

Arizona
Coconino County Sheriff's Office Mounted Unit, Arizona
Maricopa County Sheriff's Office Mounted Unit, Arizona
Scottsdale Police Department Mounted Unit, Arizona
Tempe Police Department Mounted Unit, Arizona

Arkansas
Little Rock Police Department Mounted Unit, Little Rock, Arkansas

California
Anaheim Police Department Mounted Enforcement Unit, California 
East Bay Regional Park District Police Department Mounted Patrol Unit, California
Frank G. Bonelli Regional Park Volunteer Mounted Assistance Unit, San Dimas, California
Los Angeles Police Department Mounted Unit, California
Los Angeles County Sheriff's Department Mounted Enforcement Detail, California
Modesto Police Department Mounted Unit, California
Orange County Sheriff's Department Mounted Unit, California
Placer County Sheriff's Office Mounted Unit, California
Sacramento County Sheriff's Department Mounted Enforcement Detail, California
Sacramento Police Department Mounted Patrol Unit, California
San Diego Sheriff Volunteer Mounted Patrol Unit, California
San Francisco Police Department Mounted Patrol Unit, California
San Jose Police Department Mounted Unit, California
Santa Barbara County Sheriff's Office Mounted Unit, California
Stanislaus County Sheriff's Department Mounted Unit, California

Colorado
Denver Police Department Mounted Patrol, Colorado
El Paso Sheriffs Office Mounted Unit, El Paso County, Colorado
Larimer County Sheriff's Office Mounted Posse, Colorado
 Douglas County Sheriff's Office
 Weld County Sheriff's Mounted Posse
 Parker Police Department

Delaware
New Castle County Police Department Mounted Patrol Unit, Delaware

District of Columbia
United States Park Police Horse Mounted Unit
 Metropolitan Police Department, District of Columbia, Horse Mounted Unit

Florida
Webster Police Department Mounted Patrol Unit, Florida
Citrus County Mounted Posse, Inverness, Florida
Flagler County, Mounted Unit, Florida
Fort Lauderdale Police Department Mounted Unit, Florida
Gainesville Police Department Mounted Patrol Unit, Florida
Hernando County Civilian Mounted Unit, Brooksville, Florida
Hillsborough County Sheriff Office Mounted Posse Hillsborough County, Florida
Key West Police Department, Mounted Unit, Florida
Lake County Sheriff's Office Mounted Unit, Florida
Leon County Sheriff's Office Mounted Unit, Florida
City of Miami Police Department Mounted Patrol, Florida
Orlando Police Department Mounted Patrol Unit, Florida
Pinellas Park Police Department Mounted Patrol, Florida
Polk County Sheriff's Office Mounted Enforcement Unit, Florida
Saint Petersburg Police Department Mounted Patrol Unit, Florida
Sarasota County Sheriff's Office Mounted Unit, Florida
Sumter County Mounted Reserve, Webster, Florida 
Tampa Police Department Mounted Patrol, Florida

Georgia
Atlanta Police Department Mounted Patrol, Georgia
Savannah-Chatham Metropolitan Police Department Mounted Unit, Georgia
Duluth Georgia Police Department, Georgia

Hawaii
Honolulu Police Department Horse Patrol Unit, Hawaii

Idaho
Boise Police Department Mounted Patrol, Idaho

Illinois
Chicago Police Department Mounted Patrol Unit, Illinois
Palos Park Police Department Mounted Patrol, Illinois

Indiana
Indianapolis Metropolitan Police Department Mounted Patrol Section, Indiana

Iowa
Des Moines Police Department Mounted Patrol, Iowa
Waterloo Police Department Mounted Patrol Unit, Iowa

Kansas
Shawnee County Sheriff's Department Mounted Posse, Kansas
Wichita Police Department Mounted Unit, Kansas

Kentucky
Lexington-Fayette-Urban-County Division of Police Mounted Unit, Kentucky
Louisville Metro Police Department Mounted Unit, Kentucky
Kentucky Horse Park Mounted Police Full Service State Agency, Kentucky

Louisiana
Baton Rouge Police Department Mounted Patrol
Lafayette Police Department (Louisiana), Mounted Unit, Louisiana
Mandeville Police Department, Mounted Unit
New Orleans Police Department Mounted Unit, Louisiana
Orleans Parish Sheriff's Office Mounted Division, Louisiana

Maine
Portland Police Department Mounted Unit, Maine

Maryland
Baltimore City Police Department Mounted Unit, Maryland
Maryland-National Capital Park Police
Ocean City Police Department Mounted Unit, Maryland

Massachusetts
Worcester Police Mounted Unit 
 Bershire County Sheriff Mounted Unit 
Boston Park Rangers Mounted Unit, Massachusetts
Massachusetts Park Ranger Mounted Unit, DCR
Massachusetts State Police Mounted Section
University of Massachusetts-Amherst Police Department Mounted Unit

Michigan
Barry County Sheriff Posse Mounted Division, Hastings, Michigan
Cadillac Police Department Auxiliary Horse Patrol, Michigan
Detroit Police Department Mounted Unit, Detroit, Michigan
Eaton County Sheriff's Office Mounted Unit, Michigan
Kalamazoo County Sheriff Mounted Division, Michigan
Lenawee County Sheriff Mounted Division, Michigan
Livingston County Sheriff's Department Mounted Division, Michigan
Oakland County Sheriff's Department Mounted Division, Michigan
Ottawa County Sheriff's Office Mounted Unit, Michigan
Saginaw County Sheriff's Posse Mounted Division, Saginaw
Washtenaw County Sheriff's Office Mounted Patrol Division, Michigan
Wayne County Sheriff's Office Mounted Patrol Division, Michigan

Minnesota
Duluth Police Department Mounted Patrol, Minnesota
Minneapolis Police Department Mounted Patrol, Minnesota
Saint Paul Police Department Mounted Police Unit, Minnesota

Missouri
Columbia Police Department Mounted Patrol Unit, Missouri
Metropolitan Police Department, City of St. Louis Mounted Patrol Unit, St. Louis, Missouri

Nebraska
Omaha Police Department Mounted Patrol Unit, Nebraska

Nevada
Las Vegas Metropolitan Police Department Mounted Unit, Nevada
University of Nevada, Las Vegas Police Services Mounted Police Unit, Nevada

New Hampshire
Dover Police Department Mounted Patrol, New Hampshire
Manchester Police Department Mounted Unit, New Hampshire
Hampton Police Department Mounted Patrol, New Hampshire

New Jersey

Camden City Police Department Mounted Unit, New Jersey
Morris County Park Police Mounted Unit, New Jersey
Newark Police Department Mounted Division, Newark, NJ
Rutgers University Mounted Patrol (RUMP), New Jersey (only student-run mounted patrol in the United States)
Union County Police Mounted Patrol Unit, New Jersey

New Mexico
Albuquerque Police Department, New Mexico

New York

Albany Police Department, New York
Nassau County Police Department Mounted Unit, New York
New York City Police Department Mounted Unit, New York, established 1875
New York State Park Police Mounted Unit, Saratoga Springs, New York
Rochester Police Department The Mounted Section, New York
Saratoga Springs Mounted Patrol, New York
Westchester County Department of Public Safety Mounted Unit, New York
 Rockland County Sheriff's Office Mounted Police Division (Rockland County, NY)

North Carolina
North Carolina State University Police Department Mounted Unit, Raleigh, North Carolina
Raleigh Police Department Mounted Unit, North Carolina
Wilmington Police Department, North Carolina

Ohio
Franklin County Sheriffs Office Mounted Patrol, Ohio 
Butler County Sheriff's Office Mounted Patrol, Ohio
Cincinnati Police Department Mounted Patrol, Ohio
Cleveland Metroparks Police Department Mounted Unit, Greater Cleveland, Ohio
Cleveland Police Department Mounted Unit, Ohio
Columbus Division of Police Mounted Unit, Ohio
Hamilton County Sheriff's Office Mounted Patrol, Ohio
Lake Metroparks Ranger Department, Mounted Division, Lake County, Ohio
Ross County Sheriff's Office Mounted Unit, Ohio
Summit County Sheriff's Office Mounted Patrol, Ohio
The Ohio State University Police Division Mounted Patrol, Ohio
Toledo Police Department Mounted Patrol Unit, Ohio
Willoughby Hills Police Department Mounted Unit, Willoughby Hills, Ohio
 Richland County Sheriff's Office Mounted Unit,  Mansfield, Ohio
 Medina County Mounted Unit 
 Stark County Mounted Unit
 Lima County Mounted Unit

Oklahoma
Oklahoma City Police Department Equine Unit, Oklahoma
Tulsa County Sheriff's Office, Mounted Patrol Unit, Oklahoma

Pennsylvania
Pennsylvania State Police Mounted Unit
Pittsburgh Bureau of Police Mounted Unit, re-established 2017
Allegheny County Police Department, Pennsylvania
Bethlehem Police Department Mounted Patrol Unit, Pennsylvania
Lancaster Bureau of Police Mounted Patrol, Pennsylvania
Lackawanna County Sheriff's Office Mounted Unit, Pennsylvania
Philadelphia Police Department Mounted Patrol, Pennsylvania disbanded 2004, re-established 2011
Butler County Mounted Posse, formed in 1972, 40 members, {Butler County Sheriff Dept.}

Rhode Island
Providence Police Department Mounted Command, Rhode Island

South Carolina
Charleston Police Department Horse Patrol, South Carolina

Tennessee
Memphis Police Department Mounted Unit, Tennessee
Metro Nashville Police Department Mounted Unit, Tennessee
Hendersonville Police Department Mounted Unit, Tennessee

Texas
Austin Police Department Mounted Patrol, Texas
Dallas Police Department Mounted Unit, Texas
Fort Worth Police Department Mounted Patrol, Texas
Gregg County Sheriff's Mounted Unit, Texas
Houston Police Department, Texas
Lubbock Police Department Mounted Patrol, Texas
Texas Highway Patrol Mounted Horse Patrol Unit, Texas
Galveston Police Department Mounted Patrol
 Grand Prairie Mounted Patrol
 McKinney Mounted Patrol

Virginia
Henrico County Division of Police, Virginia
Prince William County Police Horse Mounted Patrol Unit, Virginia
Richmond Police Department Mounted Team, Virginia
Virginia Beach Police Department, Virginia

Washington
Seattle Police Department Mounted Unit, Washington

Wisconsin
Madison Police Department Mounted Patrol, Madison, Wisconsin
Milwaukee Police Department Mounted Patrol Unit, Wisconsin
Wisconsin Capitol Police Department Mounted Unit, Madison, Wisconsin
Wisconsin State Fair Park Police Department Mounted Unit, West Allis, Wisconsin

Vietnam
 Đoàn cảnh sát cơ động kỵ binh – Bộ Tư lệnh CSCĐ (2020– )

Zimbabwe
 British South Africa Police (1896- )

References

Law enforcement units
Mounted police